Edward Tennant may refer to:

 Edward Tennant, 1st Baron Glenconner (1859–1920), Scottish Liberal politician
 Edward Tennant (poet) (1897–1916), English war poet, son of the 1st Baron Glenconner
 Edward Tennant (pilot) (1922–1981), who first flew the Folland Gnat